is a Japanese animator. He worked as an in-between animator at Studio Giants. In 2004, he joined Shaft, where he worked as a director for 11 years. In 2015, he went freelance.

Career
Tatsuwa joined the sub-contracting animation firm Studio Giants in 2000, where he mostly worked as a sub-contractor to Xebec. He joined Shaft in 2004. In 2007, he received his first job as a storyboard artist, and worked as an assistant director for several of Shinbo's series in 2008. 2011 saw Tatsuwa's debut as a series director with Shaft with the original video animation series Katte ni Kaizō under the chief direction of Shinbo. Tatsuwa would direct two more series with Shaft, and assist Shinbo once more, before leaving the studio in 2015. Tatsuwa became associated with studio Passione in 2018, where he first acted as chief unit director for Citrus.

Style
Although only a key animator at the time of its production, which was soon after he had joined Shaft, director Shin Oonuma commonly consulted with Tatsuwa about doing parody work on Pani Poni Dash, whom Oonuma said was good with parodies.

Works

Television series
 Highlights roles with series directorial duties. Highlights roles with assistant director or supervising duties.

OVAs
 Highlights roles with series directorial duties Highlights roles with assistant director or supervising duties

Films
 Highlights roles with film directorial duties.

Notes

Works Cited

References

External links
 
 

Anime directors
Living people
1977 births